Synaptocochlea concinna is a species of sea snail, a marine gastropod mollusk in the family Trochidae, the top snails.

Description
The size of the shell varies between 3 mm and 8 mm.

(Description as Stomatella nebulosa) The ovate-oblong shell is shaped like a Haliotis. Its back all is over striated. Its color is white, clouded with reddish brown. The spire is somewhat prominent with angular whorls. The oval aperture is elongate. The columella covers the umbilical fissure with a thick callus.

Distribution
This marine species occurs in the tropical Indo-West Pacific, Indo-Malaysia, Hawaii, Oceania and off Australia (Northern Territory, Queensland, Western Australia).

References

 Hedley, C. 1907. The Mollusca of Mast Head Reef, Capricorn Group, Queensland, part II. Proceedings of the Linnean Society of New South Wales 32: 476-513, pls 16-21
 Ladd, H.S. 1966. Chitons and gastropods (Haliotidae through Adeorbidae) from the western Pacific Islands. United States Geological Survey Professional Papers 531: 1-98 16 pls
 Cernohorsky, W.O. 1978. Tropical Pacific marine shells. Sydney : Pacific Publications 352 pp., 68 pls.
 Kay, E.A. 1979. Hawaiian Marine Shells. Reef and shore fauna of Hawaii. Section 4 : Mollusca. Honolulu, Hawaii : Bishop Museum Press Bernice P. Bishop Museum Special Publication Vol. 64(4) 653 pp
 Wilson, B. 1993. Australian Marine Shells. Prosobranch Gastropods. Kallaroo, Western Australia : Odyssey Publishing Vol. 1 408 pp.
 Zuschin, M., Janssen, R. & Baal, C. (2009). Gastropods and their habitats from the northern Red Sea (Egypt: Safaga). Part 1: Patellogastropoda, Vetigastropoda and Cycloneritimorpha. Annalen des Naturhistorischen Museums in Wien 111[A]: 73–158.

External links
 Gould, A.A. 1845. Descriptions of species of land shells from the Sandwich Islands. Proceedings of the Boston Society of Natural History 2: 26-28
 Pilsbry, H. A. (1921). Marine mollusks of Hawaii, XIV-XV. Proceedings of The Academy of Natural Sciences of Philadelphia. 72: 360-383
 Adams, A. (1850). An arrangement of Stomatellidae, including the characters of a new genus, and of several new species. Proceedings of the Zoological Society of London.
 Herbert D.G. (2015). An annotated catalogue and bibliography of the taxonomy, synonymy and distribution of the Recent Vetigastropoda of South Africa (Mollusca). Zootaxa. 4049(1): 1-98.
 To Barcode of Life (1 barcode)
 To Biodiversity Heritage Library (2 publications)
 To GenBank (3 nucleotides; 1 proteins)
 To ITIS
 To World Register of Marine Species
 

concinna
Gastropods described in 1845